Something Wicked This Way Comes is the fourth studio album by The Herbaliser. It was released via Ninja Tune on 19 March 2002. It peaked at number 71 on the UK Albums Chart.

Critical reception
At Metacritic, which assigns a weighted average score out of 100 to reviews from mainstream critics, the album received an average score of 81% based on 10 reviews, indicating "universal acclaim".

Nic Kincaid of AllMusic gave the album 4 stars out of 5, calling it "a timely achievement in music, a genre-bending statement of creative poignancy." Brad Haywood of Pitchfork gave the album a 7.0 out of 10, saying, "The beats are just fine, but they lack the risk or innovation that could potentially make them truly engaging."

Track listing

Charts

References

External links
 

2002 albums
The Herbaliser albums
Ninja Tune albums